Wildwood is an unincorporated community and census-designated place (CDP) in Blount County, Tennessee. As of the 2010 census, its population was 1,098.

It is the location of Bethlehem Methodist Church, which is listed on the National Register of Historic Places.

Demographics

References

Census-designated places in Tennessee
Census-designated places in Blount County, Tennessee
Unincorporated communities in Tennessee
Unincorporated communities in Blount County, Tennessee